Universidad de Ciencias Médicas Santa Clara Dr. Serafín Ruiz de Zárate Ruiz is a medical university in the province of Villa Clara, Cuba with students from all around the world. In this university students from many countries including Algeria, Guatemala, Pakistan, Peru, Mexico, Bolivia, South Africa and many others are studying, along with their Cuban fellows, under scholarship offered by the Government of Cuba.

Medical schools in Cuba